Betty Chew Gek Cheng (born 15 August 1964) is a Malaysian politician from the Democratic Action Party (DAP), a component party of the Pakatan Harapan (PH) opposition coalition who served as Member of the Melaka State Legislative Assembly (MLA) for Kota Laksamana from March 2004 to May 2013 and Durian Daun from November 1999 to March 2004. She also served as State Women Chief of DAP of Melaka as of 2005. She is also the spouse and wife of Lim Guan Eng, the present National Chairman and former Secretary-General of DAP, former Minister of Finance and former Chief Minister of Penang as well as the daughter-in-law of another former Secretary-General and former National Chairman of DAP, Lim Kit Siang. 

In 2005, she suffered a surprise defeat when running for re-election to the DAP Malacca committee, placing second-last, finishing ahead of only her husband. However, while her husband automatically qualified to sit on the committee by virtue of his position as party Secretary-General, Chew did not. Chew was "saddened by the results", but said she accepted her defeat. However, Teresa Kok, a DAP Member of Parliament, suggested there was a conspiracy behind the defeat of Lim and Chew in their re-election campaigns.

In 2006, it was reported that Chew would become the first Malacca assemblyman to give birth while in office. At the time, Chew had 4 children with Lim.

In 2008, Chew defeated newcomer Lee Kiat Lee for the Kota Laksamana seat where she had 11043 votes while Lee had only 3801 votes.

Election results

References

1964 births
People from Malacca
Malaysian people of Hokkien descent
Malaysian people of Chinese descent
20th-century Malaysian lawyers
Living people
Democratic Action Party (Malaysia) politicians
Members of the Malacca State Legislative Assembly
Women MLAs in Malacca
Malaysian women lawyers